A point machine (also known as a point motor, switch machine or switch motor) is a device for operating railway turnouts especially at a distance.

Overview
In the earliest times, points were operated manually by levers. Gradually, these were centralized and came to be operated from a signal box, either by rods, or by double wire arrangements.

Since the limitation of mechanical operation restricted the design of track layouts on the one hand, and tended to require more signal boxes, even lightly used ones, on the other hand, there has always been a desire of railway administrations to increase the distance that remote turnouts can be operated.  This requires some kind of power operation of points and signals.  The principal means of power operation include hydraulic, pneumatic and electric.

More recently with the increase in weight of rail, and the introduction of high speed turnouts with finer angles requiring multiple drives, points have become stiffer and beyond the capability of mechanical drives, forcing the introduction of point machines if not already done so.

Principle 
Modern point machines have an electric motor and gears to convert the rotational motion of the motor into the linear motion required to switch the points. The gear assembly also provides required transmission ratio so that it can generate necessary force to move switch blades. The machine performs following functions:
 Moving switch blades.
 Locking the blades
 Detection and proving the position of blades.

Point machine conversion - manual to motorized 

A point machine conversion system consists of a remotely controlled device attached to an existing manually operated point that allows the shunter/driver to remotely operate hand points with a radio handset. Each converter can be used as a stand-alone or multiple units can be installed operating together with routing.

In tie unit 

The latest development is to mount the switch motor inside a faux railroad tie (aka sleeper) where it is relatively hidden from damage from track maintenance machines.

See also 

 Double junction

References 

Rail technologies